Janomima mariana, the inquisitive monkey, is a moth in the family Eupterotidae first described by Adam White in 1843. It is found in the Democratic Republic of the Congo, Eritrea, Mozambique, Rwanda, South Africa, Tanzania, Zambia and Zimbabwe.

Adults are fulvous yellow, sprinkled with minute brownish spots and with a few waved brownish transverse streaks.

The larvae feed on various grasses and have been specifically reported feeding on Bauhinia and Brachystegia species, as well as Pterocarpus rotundifolius and Miscanthus violaceus.

References

Moths described in 1843
Eupterotinae
Moths of Sub-Saharan Africa